Part of the Search is an album by multi-instrumentalist Yusef Lateef recorded in 1973 (with one track from a 1971 recording session) and released on the Atlantic label.

Reception

Allmusic awarded the album 4 stars with the review by Scott Yanow calling it, "one of his better efforts from the era".

Track listing 
All compositions by Yusef Lateef except as indicated
 "K.C. Shuffle"  (Kenny Barron) - 3:42
 "Oatsy Doatsy [Part 1]" - 0:32
 "Soul's Bakery" - 2:21
 "Lunceford Prance" - 3:03
 "Rockhouse" (Ray Charles) - 3:41
 "Oatsy Doatsy [Part 2]" - 0:14
 "In the Still of the Night"  (Fred Parris) - 3:21
 "Superfine" (Bob Cunningham) - 3:23
 "Strange Lullaby"  - 4:13
 "Big Bass Drum" - 2:58
 "Gettin' Sentimental" (Gus Kahn, Matty Malneck) - 9:51

Recorded in New York City on September 1, 1971 (track 11), April 4, 1973 (tracks 1, 3 & 4), April 5, 1973 (tracks 2, 8 & 9), May 16, 1973 (tracks 5 & 7), September 13, 1973 (track 8) and December 26, 1973 (track 12)

Personnel 
Yusef Lateef - alto saxophone, tenor saxophone, flute, bamboo flute, pneumatic bamboo flute, oboe, bells, tambourine
Joe Newman, Jimmy Owens, Charles Sullivan - trumpet
Wayne Andre, Garnett Brown, Warren Covington - trombone
Jerry Dodgion, Charles McBurney, Rocky Morales Frank Wess - saxophones
Willie Bridges - saxophone, flute
Charlie Fowlkes - baritone saxophone
Al Gafa - guitar
Arnold Eidus, Emanuel Green - violin
Selwart Clarke - cello
Albert Heath - drums
Kenny Barron, Ray Bryant - piano, electric piano
Bob Cunningham, Sam Jones - bass
Bill Salter - electric bass
Ladji Camara - African percussion

References 

Yusef Lateef albums
1974 albums
Albums produced by Joel Dorn
Atlantic Records albums